Engineer Muhammad Arif Sarwari, also known simply as Engineer Arif, is a former Afghan intelligence official and politician.

Pre-Taliban
Sarwari studied electronics at a technical college, later transferring to Kabul Polytechnic. He did not complete his studies, instead joining the anti-Soviet resistance in 1982 during the Soviet–Afghan War. In 1992, after the ouster of the communists, he was appointed the Chief of Security of Kabul. He later served as the first deputy of National Directorate of Security. When the Taliban seized Kabul he joined the forces of Ahmad Shah Masoud, who was later to lead the Afghan Northern Alliance.

Northern Alliance and post-war
During the period of Taliban rule, Sarwari was the chief intelligence official of the Northern Alliance under Ahmad Shah Massoud.
Massoud's September 9, 2001 assassination took place in Aref's office.

After the September 11 attacks, he was a major figure in coordinating with the CIA's JAWBREAKER team, which worked with the Northern Alliance and prepared the way for further military operations. After the fall of Kabul he and his organization took over the existing Afghan National Directorate of Security, but he was removed by Afghan President Hamid Karzai in early 2004 and replaced by Amrullah Saleh.

Governor of Panjshir
Sarwari was Governor of Panjshir Province .

Personal life
Sarwari is married and has two sons and three daughters. He speaks Dari, Pashto, Russian and English.

References

Generic references

Living people
Members of the House of Elders (Afghanistan)
Governors of Panjshir Province
Kabul Polytechnic University alumni
1961 births